The Exeter Prize is an economics prize of the University of Exeter Business School, which has been awarded since 2012. The Exeter Prize is awarded to the best paper published in the previous calendar year in a peer-reviewed journal in the fields of Experimental Economics, Decision Theory and Behavioural Economics.

Winners 
 2021: Ryan Opera for Oprea, Ryan (2020). "What Makes a Rule Complex?". American Economic Review. 110 (12): 3913–3951. doi:10.1257/aer.20191717  
 2020: J. Aislinn Bohren, Alex Imas and Michael Rosenberg  for 
 2019: Samuel M. Hartzmark and Kelly Shue for 
 2018: Shengwu Li for 
 2017: Vojtěch Bartoš, Michal Bauer, Julie Chytilová and Filip Matějka for 
 2016: David Budescu and Eva Chen for 
 2015: Gary Charness, Francesco Feri, Miguel Melendez and Matthias Sutter for  
 2014: Tomasz Strzalecki for  
 2013: Daniel Friedman and Ryan Oprea for  
 2012: Michel Regenwetter, Jason Dana and Clintin P. Davis-Stober for

See also

 List of economics awards

References

External links
 The prize website
Economics awards